Puppet People is a TV series produced from 1973 to 1975 at CFCF-TV in  Montreal, Quebec, and telecast on most CTV affiliates throughout Canada. It was hosted by the ventriloquist Jerry Layne who worked with his "friends" Lester and Herbie, puppets created for the show by Don Keller, who was a CFCF staff member who designed sets but originally was a ventriloquist in Montreal area. These puppets had a movable lip as opposed to moveable chin in classical puppet design.

Puppet People combined pre-taped comedy sketches with a cast of full-size figures. These sketches were played into a game show with children answering questions based on the sketches.

The series was the first production for the producer/director Sidney M. Cohen.

The Lester puppet once appeared on an episode of The Love Boat.

References

External links
 Puppet People at TV Archive

1970s Canadian children's television series
Canadian television shows featuring puppetry
1973 Canadian television series debuts
1975 Canadian television series endings
CTV Television Network original programming
Television shows filmed in Montreal
1970s Canadian game shows